Robyn Charles Miller (born August 6, 1966) is the co-founder of Cyan Worlds (originally Cyan) with brother Rand Miller. He served as co-designer of the popular computer game Myst, which held the title of best-selling computer game from its release in 1993 until the release of The Sims seven years later. He also co-directed and co-lead designed the sequel to Myst, Riven, which was the best-selling computer game of its year of release, 1997. Miller composed and performed the soundtracks to both games. He also acted in Myst, portraying one of the antagonists, Sirrus (with brother and Cyan-cofounder Rand appearing as Achenar and Atrus). He co-wrote the first Myst novel, The Book of Atrus.

After the release of Riven, Miller left Cyan to pursue non-game interests, including films. He is the director of the 2013 film The Immortal Augustus Gladstone.

Early works
Miller served as a designer on Cyan Worlds's early games The Manhole, Cosmic Osmo and the Worlds Beyond the Mackerel and Spelunx.

Myst and Riven
Miller is known for his contributions in the areas of direction and design, especially in the area of visual design—the look and feel of the Myst and Riven worlds. Richard Vander Wende, co-director and co-designer of Riven, was likewise responsible for orchestrating the visual language of that world.

Composer
While at Cyan, Miller composed the soundtracks for both Myst and Riven.

In 2005 he worked on a musical project named Ambo, with W. Keith Moore.

In December 2013, he released the soundtrack for his debut film The Immortal Augustus Gladstone in digital format on Gumroad.com.

Miller composed the soundtrack for Cyan's Kickstarter-funded video game Obduction, released in August 2016. This was his first work with Cyan since Riven in 1997. Initially, he had only intended to appear in the game itself (as C.W., one of the few human characters the player interacts with), and had outright said he would not do the soundtrack. After persuasion by his brother Rand, as well as seeing the work being done on the game, he eventually agreed to compose the game's music as well as appear in the game. He stated in an interview that he enjoyed focusing solely on composing, as opposed to the additional production work he had done for Myst and Riven.

Director
Miller's debut film project is a fictional documentary film titled The Immortal Augustus Gladstone, a story about a man who believes himself to be a vampire.

Discography
Solo albums:
Myst: The Soundtrack (1995)
Riven: The Soundtrack (1998)
The Immortal Augustus Gladstone - Soundtrack (2013)
Obduction - Original Game Soundtrack (2016)
Obduction Redacted - B Sides (EP, 2016)
Little Potato (2017)

As a member of Ambo:
1000 Years and 1 Day (2005)
Ambo – Day Two - B-Sides (EP, 2005)

Filmography

See also 
List of ambient music artists

References

External links

Main sites

 
 Official blog
 
 
 
 
 
 
 
 
 Robyn Miller profile at OverClocked ReMix
 Robyn Miller at VGMdb

Articles and other
Robyn Miller article at Wired magazine
Riven cover at Wired magazine
Land of Point website (archive)
Robyn Miller interview at Feed Magazine (archive)

1966 births
Living people
American male video game actors
American video game designers
Video game composers
Virgin Records artists
People from Dallas